Thabalkaran Thangai is a 1970 Indian Tamil-language film directed by K. S. Gopalakrishnan. The film stars Gemini Ganesh and Vanisri. It was released on 13 March 1970.

Plot

Cast 

Male actors
 Gemini Ganesh as Kannan
 M. N. Nambiar
 Sundarrajan as the lawyer
 Muthuraman as Thiyagarajan
 Nagesh
 Master Ramu

Female actors
 Vanisri as Lakshmi
 Shylashri
 Sundari Bai
 Sivagami
 Jayakumari
 Kalavathi

Supporting cast
 T. K. Bhagavathi
 M. R. R. Vasu

Production 
Thabalkaran Thangai was directed by K. S. Gopalakrishnan, who also wrote the story and dialogue. It was produced by Balu under Ravi Productions. Cinematography was handled by D. V. Nathan, and editing by R. Devarajan.

Soundtrack 
The music was composed by K. V. Mahadevan, while the lyrics were written by Kannadasan. The song "Karikalan Katti vaithaan Kallanai" connects Cauvery and Kollidam in an "amourous atmosphere".

Release and reception 
Thabalkaran Thangai was released on 13 March 1970. The following day, The Indian Express wrote, "While the picture is certainly recommendable for the absence of vulgarity and the assertion of a sense of values, it is however tedious. It lacks the finesse of K. S. Gopalakrishnan. Technically it is poor. There is hardly any movements of the camera. The story-telling is so much like in his previous movies that KSG has fallen a prey to his technique."

References

External links 
 

1970 drama films
1970 films
1970s Tamil-language films
Films directed by K. S. Gopalakrishnan
Films scored by K. V. Mahadevan
Films with screenplays by K. S. Gopalakrishnan
Indian drama films